Nikos Kalles (Greek: Νίκος Καλλές; born April 20, 1987) is a Greek professional basketball player. He is a 6 ft 11 in (2.11 m) tall center.

Professional career
Kalles started his pro career in 2006, with Iraklis. He moved to PAOK in 2009. He stayed at the club until 2014. In 2014, he signed with Panelefsiniakos. 

On October 23, 2015, Kalles signed with Aries Trikala, of the Greek Basket League. After the appointment of Ioannis Kastritis as the team's head coach, he renewed his contract for one more season.

References

External links
EuroCup Profile
Eurobasket.com Profile
Greek Basket League Profile 
Draftexpress.com Profile

1987 births
Living people
Aries Trikala B.C. players
ASK Karditsas B.C. players
Centers (basketball)
Larisa B.C. players
Greek men's basketball players
Iraklis Thessaloniki B.C. players
Panelefsiniakos B.C. players
P.A.O.K. BC players
Basketball players from Larissa